Kettle River may refer to a location in North America:

Rivers
Kettle River (Columbia River) in British Columbia and Washington
Kettle River (St. Croix River), a tributary of the St. Croix River in east-central Minnesota
Kettle River (Blueberry River), a tributary of the Blueberry River in central Minnesota

Ranges
Kettle River Range,  is the southernmost range of the Monashee Mountains

Communities
Kettle River, Minnesota

See also 
 West Kettle River
 Kettle (disambiguation)